Keratosa, the keratose sponges or horny sponges, is a subclass of demosponges.

References

External links 
 
 Keratosa at the World Porifera Database

 
Sponge subclasses